José Antonio Delgado Sucre (13 May 1965 – 22 July 2006) was the first Venezuelan mountaineer to reach the summit of five eight-thousanders and one of the most experienced climbers in Latin America. Known as el indio ("The Indian", for his strength), Delgado led the first Venezuelan Everest expedition in 2001. On May 23 of that year, he and Marcus Tobía were the only members of the expedition to summit Everest. He held several records in mountaineering, such as the first paragliding flight from Pico Humboldt, Pico Bolívar, and Roraima. Delgado also made the fastest summit for a Venezuelan to the Aconcagua (from the Puente del Inca in 34 hours) and Huascarán (from the base in 14 hours).

Biography
Jose Antonio Delgado Sucre was born in Caracas, Venezuela. He studied mechanical engineering at the Universidad Simón Bolívar and married Frida Ayala with whom he had two children.

Death and legacy
Delgado was the leader of the Venezuelan Nanga Parbat expedition. He and fellow climber Edgar Guariguata flew out to Pakistan in June 2006. Due to illness Guariguata remained at base camp while Delgado went on. After he reached the summit of the Nanga Parbat on July 11, a snow storm surprised him on his descent. Delgado managed to reach camp four. After being without food or water for two days he attempted to make it to camp three. No further communications were received by base camp, so the Pakistani authorities were alerted. A group of six Pakistani mountaineers, consisting of Qurban Muhammad (Shimshal), Ghulam Rasool, Muhammad, Muhammad Ibrahim, Ghulam Muhammad, and Muhammad Ali, climbed the mountain despite the rough weather. On July 22, they found Delgado's body at an altitude of 7100m between camp three and four in the open near his tent.

During the expedition to Nanga Parbat, he was the subject of a pilot for a television series about mountaineering. Explorart Films, the production company, later developed the project into a feature documentary film, released in South America in January 2008. The film follows Jose Antonio's climbing career and includes footage of several of his expeditions including the Nanga Parbat climb and the rescue attempts that followed the accident. Jose Antonio and his wife Frida were co-producers of the film.

Awards
He was awarded the Orden al Mérito Deportivo and the Orden Vicente Emilio Sojo in 2001 by the Venezuelan government. He was a founding member of the Proyecto Cumbre (1997) and the head of the Centro Excursionista Loyola from 1982 to 1983.

Eight-thousanders
 Cho Oyu, 8153 m, Nepal-China, 1994 (first Venezuelan)
 Shishapangma 8008 m, China, 1998 (first Venezuelan)
 Gasherbrum II, 8035 m, Pakistan-China, 2000 (first Venezuelan)
 Everest, 8848 m, Nepal-China, 2001
 Nanga Parbat, 8125 m, Pakistan, 2006 (first Venezuelan)

Mountain Summits

 Pico Humboldt, 4942 m, Venezuela, 1982
 Pico Bolívar, 5007 m, Venezuela, 1983
 Chopicalqui, 6320 m, Peru, 1985
 Artesonraju, 6010 m, Peru, 1985
 Ritacuba Blanco, 5300 m, Colombia, 1986
 Artesonraju, 6010 m, Peru, 1986
 Ranrapalca, 6162 m, Peru, 1986
 Huascarán Sur, 6768 m, Peru, 1986
 Ritacuba Negro, 5200 m, Colombia, 1987
 Huayna Potosí Sur, 6050 m, Bolivia, 1987
 Illimani Central, 6438 m, Bolivia, 1987
 The Maroon Bells, USA, 1990
 Maroon Peak 4316 m
 North Maroon Peak 4272 m
 Long Peak, 4345 m, USA, 1990
 Pikes Peak, 4302 m, USA, 1990
 Popocatepetl, 5452 m, Mexico, 1991
 Iztaccíhuatl, 5286 m, Mexico, 1991
 Pico de Orizaba  Citlaltépetl, 5636 m, Mexico, 1991 
 Marmolejo, 6100 m, Chile-Argentina, 1991
 Volcán San Pedro, 5800 m, Chile-Argentina, 1991
 Aconcagua, 7021 m, Argentina, 1991
 Cotopaxi, 6005 m, Ecuador, 1991
 Chimborazo, 6310 m, Ecuador, 1991
 Cóncavo, 5200 m, Colombia, 1992
 Pan de Azúcar, 5180 m, Colombia, 1992
 Illampu, 6362 m, Bolivia, 1992
 Ama Dablam, 6812 m, Nepal, 1993
 Adam's Peak, 2233 m, Sri Lanka, 1994
 Stock Kangri, 6100, India, 1994
 Pisco, 5300 m, Peru, 1996
 Huascarán Norte, 6654 m, Peru, 1996
 Cayambe, 5840 m, Ecuador, 1997
 Denali-McKinley, 6229 m, Alaska-USA, 1998
 Muztagh Ata, 7546 m, China, 1999
 Breithorn, 4165 m, Switzerland-Italy, 1999
 Ojos del Salado, 6908 m, Chile-Argentina, 2001
 Aconcagua, 6961 m, Argentina, 2001
 Everest, 8848 m, Nepal, 2001
 Monte Bianco, 4810 m, Italy-France, 2001
 Tsacra Chico Norte, 5513 m, Peru, 2002
 Chapaev North (near Chapaev Peak), 6100 m, Kazakhstan, 2004
 Khan Tengri, 7010 m, Kazakhstan, 2005
 Nanga Parbat 8125 m, Pakistan, 2006

References

External links
The Venezuelan Nanga Parbat expedition website.
http://www.ascenso.org.ve/
Proyecto Cumbre
http://www.explorersweb.com/news.php?id=15130
https://web.archive.org/web/20170707055836/http://nangaparbat2006.explorart.com/
https://web.archive.org/web/20140517162639/http://masalladelacumbre.com/

1965 births
2006 deaths
People from Caracas
Venezuelan mountain climbers
Summiters of Mount Everest
Mountaineering deaths
Sport deaths in Pakistan
Simón Bolívar University (Venezuela) alumni